This is a list of the tallest buildings in Oceania which measures all buildings to the highest architectural detail. This list does not include the Sky Tower in Auckland, which is taller than the buildings listed but is considered a freestanding structure instead.

The tallest building is the Q1, Gold Coast at 322.5m

Tallest buildings
This list ranks buildings in Oceania that stand at least 150 m (492 ft) tall, based on CTBUH height measurement standards. This includes spires and architectural details but does not include antenna masts. An equal sign (=) following a rank indicates the same height between two or more buildings.

Tallest buildings approved or under construction
This list includes buildings that are under construction in Oceania that are planned to rise at least 200m. Not all buildings are listed.

See also
 List of tallest buildings in Australia
 List of tallest structures in New Zealand
 List of tallest buildings in Honolulu
 List of tallest buildings in Asia
 List of tallest buildings in Africa
 List of tallest buildings in Europe
 List of tallest buildings in South America
 List of tallest buildings in the world

References

External links
 Tallest buildings in Australia, Emporis.com
 SkyscraperCenter.com

Buildings and structures in Oceania
Lists of construction records
Tallest building